Tuau Lapua Lapua (born 15 April 1991 in Nanumaga) is a Tuvaluan weightlifter.

At the 2010 Commonwealth Games in Delhi, India, he finished in 15th position in the men’s final for weightlifting (62 kg), with a lift of 220 kg.

In Weightlifting at the 2011 Pacific Games he won:  -62 kg Clean & Jerk,  -62 kg Snatch,  -62 kg Total.

He competed at the 2012 Summer Olympics in the Men's 62 kg  where he finished with a rank of 12.

At the 2013 Pacific Mini Games, he made history by winning his country’s first ever gold medal in major sporting competition, when he won the  62 kg snatch. He also won   62 kg clean and jerk, and  62 kg combined event.

At the 2014 Commonwealth Games, he did not finish his event, failing to record a lift in the snatch.

References

External links
 

1991 births
Living people
Tuvaluan male weightlifters
Olympic weightlifters of Tuvalu
Weightlifters at the 2012 Summer Olympics
Commonwealth Games competitors for Tuvalu
Weightlifters at the 2014 Commonwealth Games